Leonardo Sutherland Cantin (born April 6, 1958) is a retired Cuban-born professional baseball player, an outfielder who appeared in 45 in Major League Baseball games for the 1980–1981 Chicago White Sox.

Sutherland attended Santiago High School in Garden Grove, California, and Golden West College in Huntington Beach. The White Sox selected Sutherland in the first round (third overall) in the secondary phase of the 1976 January draft.

He made his debut with the White Sox in August 1980, after almost five seasons in the Chicago farm system.  In his first game August 11 against the New York Yankees at Yankee Stadium, he singled in his first Major League at bat and went two for three with a stolen base.  The following day, he went three for five with a run batted in. On August 20, his one-out single in the ninth broke up a no-hit bid by Dan Spillner of the Cleveland Indians. He played in 34 games during the season's final two months, including 23 starts in the outfield, and batted .258 with four RBI and four stolen bases.  He then spent the entire 1981 minor league season with the Triple-A Edmonton Trappers before his recall in September. In 11 games played, most of them as a pinch runner, he scored six runs but batted only 12 times with two hits.  He played one final season of minor league baseball with Edmonton in 1982 before leaving the game.

Sutherland stole more than 30 bases in six of his seven pro seasons.  In the Majors, his 25 hits included three doubles, and he stole six bases in eight attempts.

References

External links

1958 births
Living people
Appleton Foxes players
Chicago White Sox players
Edmonton Trappers players
Golden West Rustlers baseball players
Gulf Coast White Sox players
Iowa Oaks players
Knoxville Sox players
Major League Baseball outfielders
Major League Baseball players from Cuba
Cuban expatriate baseball players in the United States
Sportspeople from Santiago de Cuba
Cuban expatriate baseball players in Canada